Sandeman is a surname. Notable people with the surname include:

Albert George Sandeman (1833–1923), British wine importer and governor of the Bank of England
Bill Sandeman (born 1942), American football offensive tackle in the NFL
Bradley Sandeman (born 1970), former English footballer
David Sandeman (1757–1835) founder of Sandeman wines and the Commercial Bank of Scotland
George Sandeman (born 1883), English cricketer
Gillian Sandeman, former Canadian politician
John Sandeman Allen (Liverpool West Derby MP) (1865–1935), British Conservative Party politician
John Sandeman Allen (Birkenhead West MP) (1892–1949), British Conservative Party politician
Laura Sandeman (1862–1929), Scottish doctor and activist
Margot Sandeman (1922–2009), Scottish painter
Mary "Aneka" Sandeman (born 1954), Scottish singer
Robert Groves Sandeman, KCSI (1835–1892), Colonial British Indian officer and administrator
Robert Sandeman (theologian) (born 1718), nonconformist theologian
Nairne Stewart Sandeman, 1st Baronet, Conservative Party politician in the United Kingdom
Toby Sandeman (born 1988), English fashion model and sprint athlete, specialising in the 200 metres
William Sandeman (1722–1790), Perthshire (Scotland) linen manufacturer